Zhu Jiaming (born 14 August 2001) is a Chinese swimmer. She competed in the women's 200 metre butterfly at the 2019 World Aquatics Championships. She also competed in the women's 200 metre butterfly at the 2022 World Aquatics Championships held in Budapest, Hungary where she was eliminated in the semifinals.

References

External links
 

2001 births
Living people
Place of birth missing (living people)
Chinese female butterfly swimmers
21st-century Chinese women